SPT0418-47 is a young and extremely distant galaxy, discovered in 2020, that is surprisingly similar to the Milky Way. We see it as it was when the universe was only 1.4 billion years old. It is surprisingly non-chaotic and contradicts the theory that all galaxies in the (Theorized) early Universe were turbulent and unstable. It is located at a distance of about twelve billion light years from the Earth's home galaxy, the Milky Way. The circular image (on the left of the accompanying picture) is our distorted view of the galaxy; the distortion is due to the gravity of a galaxy (between the Earth and the galaxy SPT0418-47 and not visible in this image) which focuses the light from SPT0418-47 into a ring. Computer modelling can be used to undo the distortion, revealing the galaxy's true appearance: a rotating disk with central bulge (on the right of the accompanying picture).

While analyzing data from the first images of a well-known early galaxy taken by NASA's James Webb Space Telescope (JWST), Cornell University astronomers discovered a companion galaxy previously hidden behind the light of the foreground galaxy -- one that surprisingly seems to have already hosted multiple generations of stars despite its young age, estimated at 1.4 billion years old."We found this galaxy to be super-chemically abundant, something none of us expected," said Bo Peng, a doctoral student in astronomy, who led the data analysis. "JWST changes the way we view this system and opens up new venues to study how stars and galaxies formed in the early universe."

Peng is the lead author of "Discovery of a Dusty, Chemically Mature Companion to z~4 Starburst Galaxy in JWST Early Release Science Data," published in the Astrophysical Journal Letters.

Earlier images captured by the Atacama Large Millimeter/submillimeter Array (ALMA) in Chile contained hints of the companion resolved clearly by JSWT, but couldn't be interpreted as anything more than random noise, said Amit Vishwas, a research associate at the Cornell Center for Astrophysics and Planetary Sciences (CCAPS) and the paper's second author.

The team estimated the companion galaxy, which they labeled SPT0418-SE, was within 5 kiloparsecs of SPT0418-47, one of the brightest dusty, star-forming galaxies in the early universe, its distant light bent and magnified by a foreground galaxy's gravity into a circle, called an Einstein ring. The Magellanic Clouds, satellites of the Milky Way are about 50 kiloparsecs away. The proximity suggests these galaxies are bound to interact with each other and potentially even merge, an observation that adds to the understanding of how early galaxies may have evolved into larger ones.

The two galaxies are modest in mass as galaxies in the early universe go, with "SE" relatively smaller and less dusty, making it appear bluer than the extremely dust-obscured ring. Based on images of nearby galaxies with similar colors, the researchers suggest that they may reside "in a massive dark-matter halo with yet-to-be-discovered neighbors."

Most surprising about the companion galaxy, considering its age and mass, was its mature metallicity -- amounts of elements heavier than helium and hydrogen, such as carbon, oxygen and nitrogen. The team estimated that as comparable to the Sun, which is more than 4 billion years old and inherited most of its metals from previous generations of stars that had 8 billion years to build them up.

"We are seeing the leftovers of at least a couple of generations of stars having lived and died within the first billion years of the universe's existence, which is not what we typically see," Vishwas said. "We speculate that the process of forming stars in these galaxies must have been very efficient and started very early in the universe, particularly to explain the measured abundance of nitrogen relative to oxygen, as this ratio is a reliable measure of how many generations of stars have lived and died."Journal Reference: Bo Peng, Amit Vishwas, Gordon Stacey, Thomas Nikola, Cody Lamarche, Christopher Rooney, Catie Ball, Carl Ferkinhoff, Henrik Spoon. Discovery of a Dusty, Chemically Mature Companion to a z ∼ 4 Starburst Galaxy in JWST ERS Data. The Astrophysical Journal Letters, 2023; 944 (2): L36 DOI: 10.3847/2041-8213/acb59c

References 

Galaxies
Horologium (constellation)